The 1980 Winter Olympics results in cross-country skiing.

Medal summary

Medal table

Participating NOCs
Twenty four nations sent cross-country skiers to compete in the events at Lake Placid.

Men's events

Women's events

See also
Cross-country skiing at the 1980 Winter Paralympics

References

External links
Official Olympic Report

 
1980 Winter Olympics
1980 Winter Olympics events
Olympics
Cross-country skiing competitions in the United States